Halil Yeral (born 1 January 2000) is a Turkish footballer who plays as a goalkeeper for Akhisarspor.

Professional career
A youth product of Akhisarspor, Yeral signed his first professional contract with the club in 2016. He made his professional debut in a 0-0 Süper Lig tie with Konyaspor on 25 May 2019.

Honours
Akhisarspor
 Turkish Super Cup: 2018

References

External links
 
 
 

Living people
2000 births
People from Akhisar
Turkish footballers
Association football goalkeepers
Akhisarspor footballers
Süper Lig players
TFF First League players
TFF Second League players